Jacco Eltingh and Paul Haarhuis were the defending champions, but Eltingh retired from the sport on November 22, 1998, and only Haarhuis competed that year. Haarhuis partnered with Patrick Galbraith, but lost in the first round to Neil Broad and Peter Tramacchi.

David Adams and John-Laffnie de Jager won in the final 6–7(5–7), 6–3, 6–4, against Neil Broad and Peter Tramacchi.

Seeds

  Patrick Galbraith /  Paul Haarhuis (first round)
  Olivier Delaître /  Fabrice Santoro (first round)
  Martin Damm /  Cyril Suk (first round)
  Piet Norval /  Kevin Ullyett (semifinals)

Draw

Finals

Qualifying

Qualifying seeds

Qualifiers
  Neville Godwin /  Mark Keil

Qualifying draw

References

External links
 Official results archive (ATP)
 Official results archive (ITF)
 Scores (with tie-breaks)

Doubles
1999 ATP Tour